National Investigation Department (NID) is the main intelligence agency of Nepal collecting information about country’s public security, economic crimes, corruption, domestic and cross border terrorism, money laundering, narcotics, and human trafficking. NID works under the Office of The Prime Minister and Council of Ministers .   

NID is one of the four major security-related agencies in Nepal, other being Nepal Police,  Armed Police Force, and  Nepal Army. Crime Investigation Department, a branch of Nepal police  and  Directorate of Military Intelligence (Nepal), a branch of Nepal Army, are not related to NID.

Heads of the NID
 Rom bahadur
Ram Prasad Shrestha
 Chand Bahadur Rai
 Lekh Bahadur Panday
 Bishnu Raj Panta
 Hari Bahadur Chaudhari
 Devi Ram Sharma
 karun Singh karki
 Ashok Dev Bhatt
 Moti Gurung
 Jeet Bahadur K.C.
 Dilipraj Regmi
 Ganesh Prasad Adhikari     
 Yadulal Kharel
 Hutaraj Thapa

See also
Nepalese Police Force
Armed Police Force Nepal
Military of Nepal
National Investigation Department of Nepal

References
https://www.everest-times.com/2022/01/06/20265/

Military of Nepal
Security forces of Nepal
Intelligence agencies
1962 establishments in Nepal
Government agencies established in 1962